Stefania goini (Vegas Falls treefrog) is a species of frog in the family Hemiphractidae. It is endemic to Amazonas, Venezuela, and known from Cerro Duida (its type locality) and the nearby Cerro Huachamacari.
Its natural habitats are streams on the tops of tepuis. It usually occurs on rocks.

References

goini
Amphibians of Venezuela
Endemic fauna of Venezuela
Taxa named by Juan A. Rivero
Amphibians described in 1968
Taxonomy articles created by Polbot
Amphibians of the Tepuis